Marco Monko (born 13 November 1997) is a Tanzanian long-distance runner. 
In 2019, he competed in the senior men's race at the 2019 IAAF World Cross Country Championships held in Aarhus, Denmark. He finished in 52nd place. He finished in 9th place in the mixed relay event.

References

External links 
 

Living people
1997 births
Place of birth missing (living people)
Tanzanian male long-distance runners
Tanzanian male cross country runners